Baruch Lumet (Burech Lumet; 16 September 1898 – 8 February 1992) was an American actor best known for his work in the Yiddish theatre.

Early life 
Lumet was born in Warsaw, then part of Congress Poland, to a Yiddish-speaking Jewish family. He immigrated to the United States from Poland with his wife Eugenia Gitl Lumet (née Wermus) and daughter Felicia (1920–1980) in 1922, where his son, film director Sidney Lumet (1924–2011), was born.

Career 
Although he appeared with his son in the film ...One Third of a Nation... in 1939, the elder Lumet made few film appearances, though he played character roles in two of Sidney's films from the 1960s, The Pawnbroker (1964) and The Group (1966). He also appeared in Woody Allen's comedy Everything You Always Wanted to Know About Sex but Were Afraid to Ask, improbably cast as an elderly rabbi with a bondage fetish.

From 1953 to 1960, Lumet was the director of the Dallas Institute of Performing Arts and the Knox Street Theater in Dallas. Among his students were Jayne Mansfield and Tobe Hooper.

Filmography

Sources
 Finding Aid for the Baruch Lumet Papers, 1955-1983, Online Archive of California

References

External links

1898 births
1992 deaths
American people of Polish-Jewish descent
Jewish American male actors
Jewish Polish male actors
Polish emigrants to the United States
Baruch
Male actors from Warsaw
Yiddish theatre performers
20th-century American Jews